This is a list of notable women cookbook writers.

Australia
Stephanie Alexander (born 1940), restaurateur, cookbook writer
Margaret Fulton (1924–2019), British-born journalist, cookbook writer
Donna Hay (born 1971), popular cookbook writer, magazine editor
Tess Mallos (1933–2012), food journalist, cookbook writer, specializing in Greek and Middle Eastern cuisine
Kim McCosker, cookbook writer since 2007
Mietta O'Donnell (1950–2001), chef, restaurateur, food critic, cookbook writer
Wilhelmina Rawson (1851–1933), Australia's first female cookbook writer publishing Mrs. Lance Rawson's cookery book and household hints in 1876
Charmaine Solomon (born 1930), Australian cook, author of 31 cookbooks and the creator of her own brand of spice blends and marinades

Austria
Katharina Prato (1818–1897), cookbook writer, published the highly popular Die süddeutsche Küche in 1858

Bangladesh
Siddika Kabir (1931–2012), nutritionist, educator, cookbook writer, television host

Canada
Cecily Brownstone (1909–2005), food editor, cookbook writer
Ayesha Curry (born 1989), chef, cookbook writer, television personality
Christine Cushing (graduated 1986), Greek-born television chef, cookbook writer
Meeru Dhalwala, Indian-born restaurateur, cookbook writer
Margaret Dickenson, cookbook writer since 1996, television personality
Naomi Duguid (born 1950), photographer, cookbook writer
Norene Gilletz (1940–2020), kosher cookbook writer
Candice Hutchings (born 1988), food blogger, youtuber, cookbook writer
Marthe Miral (fl. 1934), collective pseudonym used by Maple Leaf Milling Company produced cookbooks translated into French
Siue Moffat (born 1973), chocolatier, filmmaker, cookbook writer
Margo Oliver (1923–2010), radio and television cook, cookbook writer
Jean Paré (born 1927), caterer, cookbook writer
Anna Lee Scott (fl. 1930s–1960s), house name used by Maple Leaf Milling Company produced cookbooks published in English
Colleen Taylor Sen (born 1944), language teacher, translator, food and travel writer, cookbook writer
Edna Staebler (1906–2006), literary journalist, cookbook writer
Anita Stewart (1947–2020), food activist, food and cookbook writer
Lucy Waverman, food journalist, columnist, cookbook writer

China
Yan-kit So (1933–2001), food historian, cookbook writer

Denmark
Mette Blomsterberg (born 1970), pastry chef, restaurateur, cookbook writer
Caroline Fleming (born 1975), entrepreneur, television personality, Danish cookbook writer
Kristine Marie Jensen (1858–1923), highly popular Danish cookbook writer
Anne Marie Mangor (1781–1865), pioneering Danish cookbook writer
Helena Patursson (1864–1916), actress, feminist, playwright, writer, author of the first Faroese cookbook Matreglur fyri hvørt hús (Food-rules for every house, 1908)
Bi Skaarup (1952–2014), archaeologist, food historian, non-fiction writer, curator

France
Julie Andrieu (born 1974), photographer, television and radio host, cookbook writer
Simone Beck (1904–1991), cookbook writer, cooking teacher, played important role in introducing French cooking into American kitchens
Louisette Bertholle (1905–1999), chef, cookbook writer on French cuisine
Clotilde Dusoulier (born 1979), food writer, blogger, cookbook writer in English and French
Madeleine Kamman (1931–2018), chef, restaurateur, cookery teacher, cookbook writer
Corinne Trang, author of cookbooks on Asian cuisine since 1999
Mapie de Toulouse-Lautrec (1901–1972), journalist, cookbook writer

Germany
Henriette Davidis (1801–1876), popular 19th-century German cookbook writer, author of Praktisches Kochbuch (1845)
Susanna Eger (1640–1713), cook and cookbook writer, author of Leipziger Kochbuch (1706)
Sabina Welserin, author of the early cookbook Das Kochbuch der Sabina Welserin (1553)
Anna Wecker (died 1596), early cookbook writer
Luisa Weiss (born 1977), Italian-American food writer, author of Classic German Baking (2016)
Rebekka Wolf, early German-Jewish cookbook writer, published Kochbuch für israelitische Frauen in 1851

Greece
Aglaia Kremezi, Greek food journalist, educator, cookbook writer

Guadeloupe
Vanessa Bolosier, French Caribbean food writer, model, living in London since 2005

India
Tarla Dalal (1936–2013), chef, cookbook writer, television personality
Ritu Dalmia (born 1973), chef, restaurateur, television personality, cookbook writer
Bilkees I. Latif, social work, writer, published Essential Andhra Cookbook (1999)
Nita Mehta, Indian cookbook writer since the 1990s
Mrs Balbir Singh (1912–1994), chef, cookery teacher, cookbook writer
Beatrice A. Vieyra, author of the early cookbook on Indian cooking, Culinary Art Sparkles (1915)

Iran
Sanaz Minaie, chef, cookbook writer since 1978
Roza Montazemi (c.1921–2009), cookbook writer

Ireland
Darina Allen (born 1948), cook, cookbook writer
Rachel Allen (born 1972), chef, television personality, cookbook writer
Trish Deseine (born 1964), cookbook writer, writing in French and English, television personality
Theodora FitzGibbon (1916–1991), cookbook writer, model, actress
Catherine Fulvio, cook, cookbook writer, television personality
Maura Laverty (1907–1966), cookbook writer, novelist, journalist and broadcaster
Clodagh McKenna (born 1975), cookbook writer, columnist, chef and television presenter
Rozanna Purcell (born 1990), cook, cookbook writer, model, television personality

Israel
Jamie Geller (born 1978), American-born Israeli cookbook writer since 2007
Janna Gur, Latvian-born emigrant to Israel in 1974, editor, cookbook writer on Israeli and Jewish cuisine

Italy
Ada Boni (1881–1973), magazine editor, cookbook writer
Susanna Cutini (born 1962), chef, Italian cookbook writer
Manuela Darling-Gansser (born 1950), cookbook writer, television personality, based in Australia

Japan
Asako Kishi (1923–2015), cookbook writer, journalist
Harumi Kurihara (born 1947), cookbook writer, television personality 
Katsuyo Kobayashi (1937–2014), cookbook writer, television personality 
Miyuki Hatoyama (born 1943), wife of former Prime Minister Yukio Hatoyama, actress, interior designer, cookbook writer

South Korea
Jang Gye-hyang (1598–1680), poet, thinker, welfare worker, Asia's first female cookbook writer 음식디미방 (1670)

Netherlands
Wina Born (1920–2001), journalist, profuse cookbook writer and columnist
Martine Wittop Koning (1870–1963), nutrition expert, cookbook writer

New Zealand
Annabel Langbein (born 1958), cookbook writer since 1988
Annabelle White, food columnist, cookbook writer since 1997
Chelsea Winter, winner of third New Zealand masterchef; went on to write (currently) 4 cookbooks

Norway
Wenche Andersen (born 1954), chef, television personality, cookbook writer
Maren Elisabeth Bang (1797–1884), wrote the first Norwegian cookbook to be printed: Huusholdnings-Bog, indrettet efter den almindelige Brug i norske Huusholdninger (1831) 
Dorothea Christensen (1847–1908), educator, cookbook writer, author of Norway's first cookery textbook Kogebog for Folkeskole og Hjemmet (1891)
Henriette Schønberg Erken (1866–1953), popular cookbook writer
Ingrid Espelid Hovig (1924–2018), chef, television personality, cookbook writer
Karen Splid Møller (1800–1880), author of the handwritten Moldegård Cookbook begun in 1819
Hanna Winsnes (1789–1872), poet, Norway's first female novelist, author of the early cookbook Lærebog i de forskjellige Grene af Huusholdningen (1845)

Poland
Wincenta Zawadzka (c. 1824–1894), author of the popular Polish-language cookbook Kucharka litewska (1843)
Lucyna Ćwierciakiewiczowa (1829–February 1901), author of the popular Polish-language cookbook Jedyne praktyczne przepisy wszelkich zapasów spiżarnianych oraz pieczenia ciast (The only practical compendium of recipes for all household stocks and pastry) (1858)

Romania
Simona Lazăr (or Simona Nicoleta Lazăr) (born 1968), journalist, gastronome, food critic, cookbook writer, publisher, author of many culinary books and studies about history of gastronomy and cookbooks

Slovakia
Zdena Studenková (born 1954), actress, singer, cookbook writer

Spain
Carmen de Burgos (1867–1932), journalist, writer, author of ¿Quiere usted comer bien?
Miriam González Durántez (born 1968), Spanish lawyer and cookbook writer

Sweden

Gustafva Björklund (1794–1862), Finnish-born restaurateur, cookbook writer
Margareta Elzberg (fl. 1751), author of the first authentic Swedish cookbook 
Lotta Lundgren (born 1971), television presenter, cookbook writer
Tina Nordström (born 1973), chef, television personality, cookbook writer
Sofia von Porat (born 1989), travel writer, cookbook writer
Anna Maria Rückerschöld (1725–1805), housekeeping specialist, cookbook writer
Cajsa Warg (1703–1769), pioneering cookbook writer
Johanna Westman (born 1969), television host, children's writer, cookbook writer

Switzerland
Maria Susanna Kübler (1814–1873), German-speaking Swiss writer, housekeeping guides and cookbooks

Ukraine 

 Olha Franko (1896–1987), creator of first Ukrainian cookbook

United Kingdom
Eliza Acton (1799–1859), poet, cook, early cookbook writer, author of the influential Modern Cookery for Private Families (1845)
Zoe Adjonyoh (born late 1970s), British writer and cook
Gretel Beer (1921–2010), Austrian-born cookbook and travel writer, columnist
Isabella Beeton (1836–1865), author of Mrs Beeton's Book of Household Management, 1861
Mary Berry (born 1935), television presenter, cookbook writer
Ravinder Bhogal, Kenyan-born British chef, since 2010 food writer and television host
Susan Brookes, resident chef on This Morning, television presenter and cookbook writer
Sarah Brown, author of Sarah Brown's Vegetarian Kitchen and television series
May Byron (1861–1936), writer, poet and cookbook writer
Deborah Cavendish, Duchess of Devonshire (1920–2014), writer, socialite
Fanny Cradock (1909–1994), restaurant critic, television cook, cookbook writer
Sophie Dahl (born 1977), model, cookbook writer, television presenter
Elizabeth David (1913–1992), cookbook writer, covering French, Italian and British cooking, author of the influential 1950 A Book of Mediterranean Food 
Anna Del Conte (born 1925), Italian-born food and cookbook writer
Josceline Dimbleby (born 1943), ´food columnist, cookbook writer
Fuchsia Dunlop, cookbook writer since 2001, specializing in Chinese cuisine
Harry Eastwood (born c.1980), chef, cookbook writer, television personality
Rose Elliot, author of vegetarian cookbooks, starting with Simply Delicious (1967)
Lady Elinor Fettiplace (1570 – in or after 1647), compiler of a manuscript book, now known under the title Elinor Fettiplace's Receipt Book, dated 1604.
Sabrina Ghayour (born 1976), Iranian-born chef and cookbook writer
Hannah Glasse (1708–1770), pioneering cookbook writer, published The Art of Cookery made Plain and Easy in 1747
Vivien Goldman (born 1954), journalist, cookbook writer, musician
Patience Gray (1917–2005), cookbook and travel writer
Jane Grigson (1928–1990), cookbook writer
Sophie Grigson (born 1959), columnist, cookbook writer
Christian Guthrie Wright (1844–1907), educator, co-founder of the Edinburgh School of Cookery, cookbook writer
Kate Halford, cookbook writer in the 1910s
Dorothy Hartley (1893–1985), author of Food in England (1954)
Margot Henderson (born 1964), chef, caterer, cookery writer
Ching He Huang (born 1978), British Taiwanese food writer and television chef
Anissa Helou (born 1952), chef, cookbook writer, specializing in Mediterranean, Middle East, and North African cuisines
Mary Hooper (1829–1904), novelist, children's writer, cookbook writer
Madhur Jaffrey (born 1933), Indian-born actress, food and travel writer, and television personality
Anna Jones (born 1979), chef, writer, and author
Diana Kennedy (1923–2022), cookbook writer, specializing in Mexican cuisine
Rachel Khoo (born 1980), cook, broadcaster, cookbook writer
Janet Laurence (born 1937), novelist, cookbook writer
Nigella Lawson (born 1960), cook, television personality
Pinky Lilani (born 1954), Indian-born writer, food expert, feminist
Ruth Lowinsky (1893–1958), society hostess, cookbook writer
Veronica Maclean (1920–2005), hotelier, cookbook writer
Agnes Catherine Maitland (1850–1906), principal of Somerville College, Oxford, cookbook writer
Elizabeth Marshall (fl. 1770–1790), cookery educator, cookbook writer
Mary McCartney (born 1969), photographer, vegetarian cookery writer
F. Marian McNeill (1885–1973)
Thomasina Miers (born 1976), cook, writer, restaurateur, television presenter
Countess Morphy (c.1874–1938), American-born dance writer, cookbook writer
Elisabeth Lambert Ortiz (1915–2003), cookbook writer specializing in Latin American cuisine
Elizabeth Moxon (fl. 1740–1754), pioneering cookbook writer, author of the influential English Housewifry
Stasha Palos (born 1972), artist, cookbook writer
Marguerite Patten (1915–2015), home economist, broadcaster, cookbook writer
Constance Peel (1868–1934), journalist, household management specialist, cookbook writer
Rose Prince (born 1962), cookbook writer
Elizabeth Raffald (1733–1781), businesswoman, author of The Experienced English Housekeeper (1769)
Claudia Roden (born 1936), Egyptian-born cultural anthropologist, cookbook writer
Evelyn Rose (1925–2003), Anglo-Jewish cookbook writer, broadcaster
Janet Ross (1842–1927), historian, biographer, cookbook writer
Maria Eliza Rundell (1745–1828), author of A New System of Domestic Cookery (1806)
Rejina Sabur-Cross (born 1974), cookbook writer, blogger
Jane Scott, Duchess of Buccleuch (1929–2011), model, cookbook writer
Eliza Smith (died c.1732), cookbook writer, author of the popular The Compleat Housewife (1727)
Katie Stewart (1934–2013), food columnist, cookbook writer
Sarah St. John (1669–1755), clergyman's wife, maintained a manuscript recipe book
Caroline Waldegrave (born 1952), wine entrepreneur, cookbook writer
Anne Willan (born 1938), food educator, food and cookbook writer
Amy Willcock, American-born cookbook writer since 2002
Delia Smith (born 1941), cook, author, TV presenter, businesswoman

United States

A
Mandy Aftel (born 1948), perfumer and cookbook author
Barbara Albright (1955–2006), author of cookbooks and books on knitting
Ida Bailey Allen (1885–1973), food editor, chef, restaurateur, cookbook writer
Jackie Alpers (born 1968), cookbook author, food photographer
Jean Anderson, editor, food columnist, cookbook writer

B
Lidia Bastianich (born 1947), chef, television personality, cookbook writer, restaurateur
Najmieh Batmanglij (born 1947), Iranian-American chef, cookbook writer
Ann Bauer (born 1966), essayist, novelist, cookbook writer
Esther Bradford Aresty (1908–2000), culinary historian, cookbook writer
Susan Branch (born 1947), painter, designer, writer, cookbook writer
Celia Brooks Brown (born 1970), chef, cookbook writer, television host, based in London
Helen Evans Brown (1904–1964), cookbook writer, columnist, authority on west coast food, culinary historian, cookbook collector
Marian Burros, food columnist, cookbook writer since 1962
Anne Byrn (graduated 1978), journalist, food editor, cookbook writer
Gesine Bullock-Prado (born 1970), pastry chef, cookbook writer, attorney, former film executive
Jane Butel, television presenter, cookbook writer since 1980, specializing in Tex-Mex cooking

C
Biba Caggiano (1936–2019), Italian-born restaurateur, television presenter and Italian cookbook writer since 1986
Karyn Calabrese (born 1947), restaurateur, cookbook writer
Mary Jane Goodson Carlisle (1835–1905), Acting First Lady of the United States
Penelope Casas (1943–2013), cookbook writer specializing in Spanish cooking
Irena Chalmers (1935–2020), food commentator, essayist, cookbook writer
Leah Chase (1923–2019), Creole chef, cookbook writer
Joyce Chen (1917–1994), Chinese-American chef, cookbook writer, television personality
Andrea Chesman, cookbook writer since 1999
Julia Child (1912–2004), chef, cookbook writer, television personality, specialized in French cuisine
Leeann Chin (1933–2010), Chinese-born American restaurateur, cookbook writer
Grace Zia Chu (1899–1999), influential American-Chinese chef, cookbook writer
Shirley Corriher (born 1935), biochemist, cookbook writer
Chloe Coscarelli (born 1987), vegan chef, cookbook writer
Mildred Cotton Council (1929-2018) restaurateur, cookbook author
Marion Cunningham (1922–2012), cookbook editor and writer

D
Melissa d'Arabian (born 1968), chef, television personality, cookbook writer
Paula Deen (born 1947), chef, television personality, cookbook writer
Giada De Laurentiis (born 1970), Italian-born chef, television personality, cookbook writer
Erica De Mane (born 1953), chef, cookbook writer, teacher, specializing in Italian cuisine
Nikki Dinki (born 1983), chef, cookbook writer, blogger
Crescent Dragonwagon (born 1952), novelist, poet, cookbook writer
Ree Drummond (born 1969), cookbook writer, photographer, television personality, blogger
Nathalie Dupree (born 1939), chef, television presenter, cookbook writer

E
Renee Erickson (born 1972), Seattle chef and cookbook writer
Mary Ann Esposito (born 1942), chef, cookbook writer, host of Ciao Italia with Mary Ann Esposito since 1989

F
Florence Fabricant, food critic and cookbook writer since 1972
Lisa Fain, food writer, blogger, cookbook writer
Fannie Farmer (1857–1915), American/Canadian culinary expert, cookbook writer who introduced standardized measuring
Susie Fishbein (born 1968), Jewish kosher cookbook writer
Zonya Foco (born 1963), nutritionist, television personality, cookbook writer on healthy eating

G
Beverly Gannon (born c.1949), Hawaiian chef, restaurateur, cookbook writer
Ina Garten (born 1948), television personality, cookbook writer
Teresa Giudice (born 1972), television personality, cookbook writer
Darra Goldstein (born 1951), Russian professor, cookbook writer and editor
Meta Given (1888–1981), nutritionist, cookbook writer
Aliza Green, cookbook writer since 1997
Barbara Grunes (born 1941), food consultant, cookbook writer

H
Jaden Hair, Hong Kong-born American chef, food columnist and photographer, active since 2007
June Hersh, Kosher cookbook writer
Amanda Hesser (born 1971), food editor, cookbook writer
Janet McKenzie Hill (1852–1933), nutritionist, cookbook writer
Elizabeth O. Hiller (circa 1856–1941),  cookbook writer and professor of culinary arts
Ingrid Hoffmann (born 1965), Colombian-American restaurateur, television personality and cookbook writer
Annemarie Huste (1943–2016), German chef and cookbook writer

I
Antonia Isola (born 1876), author of the first Italian cookbook published in the United States

J
Madhur Jaffrey (born 1933), Indian-born actress, food and travel writer, television personality
Pati Jinich (born 1972), Mexican-American chef, television personality, cookbook writer
Judith Jones (1924–2017), literary editor, cookbook writer

K
Barbara Kafka (1933–2018), 
Mollie Katzen (born 1950), chef, cookbook writer, specializing in vegetarian cuisine
Bethany Kehdy (born 1981), Lebanese-American culinary expert and cookbook writer
Carol Kicinski, television chef, magazine editor, gluten-free cookbook writer
Candice Kumai, chef, cookbook writer since 2009

L
Padma Lakshmi (born 1970), Indian-born actress, television personality, cookbook writer
Frances Moore Lappé (born 1944), nutritionist, non-fiction writer, cookbook writer
Katie Lee (born 1981), chef, novelist, food critic, cookbook writer
Sandra Lee (born 1966), television chef, cookbook writer
Aliya LeeKong (born 1978), chef, television personality, cookbook writer
Eileen Yin-Fei Lo (1937–2022), Chinese-born chef, cookbook writer since the 1970s
Kasma Loha-unchit (born 1950), Thai-born cookbook writer
Cathy Luchetti (born 1945), non-fiction writer, cookbook and food writer
Sheila Lukins (1942–2009), food and cookbook writer, columnist
Barbara Lynch, since 1998 restaurateur, cookbook writer

M
Deborah Madison (graduated 1968), food and cookbook writer, vegetarian specialist
Robynne Maii
Sarah Helen Mahammitt (c. 1873–1956), cookbook writer, cooking teacher
Barbara Abdeni Massaad (born 1970), Lebanese-American cookbook writer, photographer, television personality
Daisy Martinez, actress, model, television personality, chef and cookbook writer
Judy Mazel (1943–2007), nutritionist, cookbook writer
 Mary Margaret McBride (1899–1976), radio host and cookbook author 
Tracye McQuirter, vegan activist and cookbook writer
Alice Medrich, cookbook writer since the 1990s, specializing in chocolate desserts
Whitney Miller, food writer, television chef
Mary Sue Milliken, chef, restaurateur, television personality, cookbook writer since 1898
Julie Montagu (born 1972), cookbook writer, yoga teacher
Sara Moulton (born 1952), chef, television personality, cookbook writer

N
Joan Nathan, since 1975 cookbook writer, specializing in Jewish cooking

O
Mildred Ellen Orton (1911–2010), business woman, cookbook writer
Daphne Oz (born 1986), journalist, television personality, cookbook writer

P
Gwyneth Paltrow (born 1972), actress, singer, cookbook writer
Petra Paredez pastry chef, cookbook author
Ani Phyo (born 1968), Canadian-born organic chef, cookbook writer
Thelma Pressman (1921–2010), microwave cookery specialist, cookbook writer

R
Mary Randolph (1762–1828), cookbook writer, author of The Virginia House-Wife (1824)
Rachael Ray (born 1968), chef, television personality, cookbook writer
Ruth Reichl (born 1948), food editor, cookbook writer
Kay Robertson (born late 1940s), television personality, cookbook writer
Sallie Ann Robinson, cookbook writer since 2003
Irma S. Rombauer (1877–1962), cookbook writer, author of The Joy of Cooking (1931)
Mary Swartz Rose (1874–1941), nutritionist, food writer

S
Mildred Brown Schrumpf (1903–2001), food columnist, educator, cookbook writer
Carolyn Scott-Hamilton, Colombian-born journalist, television personality and, since 2012, cookbook writer
Jessica Seinfeld (born 1971), cookbook writer
Kim Severson (born 1961), columnist, cookbook writer
Louisa Shafia, Iranian-American chef and cookbook author
Martha Rose Shulman, cookbook writer, cooking teacher, food columnist

T
Mary Virginia Terhune (1830–1922), novelist, non-fiction writer, cookbook writer (Marion Harland)
Amy Thielen (graduated 1997), chef, food writer, television personality
Christina Tosi (born 1981), chef, television personality, cookbook writer

V
Marcela Valladolid (born 1978), chef, television personality, cookbook writer on Mexican cuisine

W
Danielle Walker (born 1985), gluten-free food writer, cookbook writer
Alice Waters (born 1944), chef, restaurateur, cookbook writer
Patricia Wells (born 1946), restaurant critic, cookbook writer
Alexandra Wentworth (born 1965), actress, cookbook writer
Caroline Randall Williams (born 1987), educator, poet, cookbook writer
Virginia Willis (born 1966), chef, photographer, cookbook writer
Paula Wolfert (born 1938), cookbook writer specializing in Mediterranean food

Y
Sherry Yard (born 1964), chef, restaurateur, cookbook writer
Trisha Yearwood (born 1964), singer, actress, cookbook writer, television personality
Dina Yuen, industrial engineer, musician, entrepreneur, cookbook writer on Indonesian cooking

Cookbook